Mark or Marc Mitchell may refer to:

Sports
 Mark Mitchell (American figure skater) (born 1968), American retired competitive figure skater
 Marc Mitchell (basketball) in 2008 McDonald's All-American Boys Game
 Mark Mitchell (basketball) (born 2003), American college basketball player
 Mark Mitchell (Canadian figure skater), Canadian ice dancer
 Marc Mitchell (CFL) in 2004 CFL Draft, Canadian player of Canadian football
 Mark Mitchell (footballer) (born 1951), Australian footballer in Australian-rules football
 Marc Mitchell (racing driver) (born 1983), American stock car racing driver
 Mark Mitchell (speed skater) (born 1961), American Olympic speed skater

Others
 Mark Mitchell (actor) (born 1954), Australian actor and comedian
 Mark Mitchell (musician), bass guitarist for American metal bands Throwdown, Culture and Until the End
 Mark Mitchell (New Zealand politician) (born 1968), New Zealand MP
 Mark Mitchell (researcher), Director of the Applied Concepts Laboratory at Georgia Tech Research Institute
 Mark Mitchell (Vermont politician) (1934–2011), American architect and politician
 Mark E. Mitchell, United States Army officer and Distinguished Service Cross recipient
 Marc Mitchell (musician), Tales from the Engine Room

References